The Six Days of Ghent is a six-day track cycling race held annually in Ghent, Belgium.

It takes place in the Kuipke velodrome in Ghent's Citadelpark.

The 2006 event from 21 November to 26 November was marred by the death of one of the riders. During the fifth day's racing, Isaac Gálvez of Spain rode into the barrier edging the outside of the track and died on his way to hospital.

The event includes the Memorial Patrick Sercu madison, named after the former race director at Ghent and holder of the world record for number of six-day victories, Patrick Sercu, who died in 2019. 

The 2009 event took place from 24 November to 29 November. A Danish team formed by Alex Rasmussen and his companion Michael Mørkøv won with a 3-point difference. The previous year's winner, Iljo Keisse, ended second.

The 2010 event was held from 23 November to 28 November.

The track used for the event, the Kuipke, is measured at 166.66 m, with steep side banks surrounding the track.

List of winning teams

See also

 Six Days of Brussels
 Six Days of Amsterdam
 Six Days of Grenoble
 Six Days of New York

References

External links
Official site - primarily in Dutch

Sports competitions in Ghent
Cycle races in Belgium
Recurring sporting events established in 1922
1922 establishments in Belgium
Six-day races
Annual sporting events in Belgium
Autumn events in Belgium